Two sharps may refer to:
D major, a major musical key with two sharps
B minor, a minor musical key with two sharps